Hardies Platform was a railway station on the Sandown railway line in the then-industrial suburb of Camellia in Sydney, Australia. It opened 4 April 1938 and served a nearby factory owned by James Hardie Industries. On 18 June 1959, the original platform was replaced by a new one located on the up track on the Sandown side of the Grand Avenue level crossing. Passenger services on the Sandown line, and hence to Hardies, ceased on 19 December 1991.

Hardie was among a number of companies that had private sidings on the line. These were named Hardies  Asbestos  Siding (originally the Asbestos  Slate  and  Sheet  Manufacturing  Siding), which opened on 25 October 1916, and Hardies  Asbestos  Siding No. 2, which opened on 1 May 1926. Both sidings were connected separately to the line and were removed on 13 November 1990.

References 

Disused railway stations in Sydney
Railway stations in Australia opened in 1938
Railway stations in Australia opened in 1959
Railway stations closed in 1991
1991 disestablishments in Australia